Qarah Charyan (also Romanized as Qarah Charyān, Qareh Charyān, and Qareh Cheryān; also known as Ghareh Chariyan, Karachar, Qarachar, Qarehchar, and Qareh Jeryān) is a village in Zanjanrud-e Pain Rural District, Zanjanrud District, Zanjan County, Zanjan Province, Iran. At the 2006 census, its population was 417, in 97 families.

References 

Populated places in Zanjan County